Markton may refer to:

Markton, Pennsylvania, an unincorporated community in Jefferson County
Markton, Wisconsin, an unincorporated community in Langlade County